Benjamin Williams (1751–1814) was an American politician, last Federalist governor of North Carolina.

Benjamin Williams may also refer to:

 Benjamin Franklin Williams (1819–1886), Methodist minister and Texas politician
 Benjamin Williams (Vermont politician) (1876–1957), American politician, lieutenant governor of Vermont, 1931–1933
 Benjamin Samuel Williams (1822–1890), English orchidologist and nurseryman
 Benjamin Thomas Williams (1832–1890), British Member of Parliament for Carmarthen, 1878–1882
 Benjamin Williams (athlete) (born 1992), British triple jumper
 Benny Williams (musician) (1931–2007), American bluegrass musician

See also
Ben Williams (disambiguation)
Benny Williams (disambiguation)